Grubbs may refer to:

People
 Grubbs (surname)

In fiction
 Grubbs Grady, a main character in The Demonata series of novels
 Verla Grubbs, a character in the All My Children TV series

Other uses
 Grubbs catalyst, a series of transition metal carbene complexes used as catalysts for olefin metathesis
 Grubbs's test for outliers, a statistical test used to detect outliers
 Grubb's Tramway (Mowbray), a tramway in northern Tasmania
 Grubb's Tramway (Zeehan), a tramway in western Tasmania
 Grubbs, Arkansas
 Grubbs Corner, West Virginia
 United States v. Grubbs, a 2006 United States Supreme Court case

See also
Grubb (disambiguation)